Eiríkr II  may refer to:
Eric II of Denmark (c. 1090 – 1137)
Eric II of Norway (1268–1299)

See also
Eric II (disambiguation)